Cardiff South and Penarth is a constituency created in 1983 represented in the House of Commons of the UK Parliament since 2012 by Stephen Doughty, a Labour Co-op MP.  It is the largest such entity in Wales, with an electorate of 75,175 and one of the most ethnically diverse.

History

Creation and boundary history
Prior to 1983 Penarth had been part of the abolished Barry constituency, represented by the Conservative backbencher Sir Raymond Gower. Most of the electorate of the new constituency had previously fallen into the abolished seat of Cardiff South East, represented by former Prime Minister, James Callaghan.

Its boundaries remained unchanged until the 2010 redistribution, when Sully was added to this constituency from the Vale of Glamorgan seat.

Political history
Cardiff South and Penarth has had three MPs since its creation, containing some very safe Labour wards from Cardiff such as Butetown, Grangetown and Splott, and several wards from the neighbouring borough of the Vale of Glamorgan, with Penarth mostly favourable to Labour, but some decent Conservative areas as Plymouth and Sully in the southern end of the seat. The first, elected at the 1983 general election, was the former Labour Prime Minister James Callaghan, who secured the seat with a 5.4% majority over Conservative David Tredinnick. Callaghan had immediately prior to the dissolution of Parliament, represented Cardiff South East. Callaghan first became an MP at the 1945 general election, for Cardiff South.

The second MP was Alun Michael (Labour and Co-operative Party) who served 25 years from 1987 before choosing to stand down in 2012. Michael's affiliation with the Co-operative Party did not appear on ballot papers at the 2010 general election because the Electoral Commission ruled that any joint candidates who wanted the names of both their parties included on the ballot paper could not also display the Labour red rose logo. Michael opted to drop the reference to the Co-operative Party but after the election denounced the ruling as "an outrageous piece of incompetence by the Electoral Commission". Michael briefly became Secretary of State for Wales in 1998. Michael held the seat at the 2010 general election with a majority of 10.6% following a 6% swing to the Conservative candidate.

In 2012, Michael was selected by the Labour and Co-operative Parties as their candidate for the election of a Police and Crime Commissioner for the South Wales Police force area and announced he would be standing down from Parliament.

At a by-election held on 15 November 2012, Labour's decline was reversed coupled with very low turnout (down 38.2% on the previous election). Labour's Stephen Doughty succeeded Alun Michael winning 47.3% of the overall vote. This was an increase (in share-of-the-vote terms) on Michael's 2010 performance. However, in terms of actual votes cast (9,193 compared with 17,262 in 2010), it was Labour's lowest in this constituency. The 2015 result gave the seat the 83rd-smallest majority of Labour's 232 seats by percentage of majority. Labour's result in 2017 saw them secure their largest ever margin in the constituency in terms of raw votes.

Other parties
Five parties' candidates achieved more than the deposit-retaining threshold of 5% of the vote in 2015. The second-placed candidate has been a Conservative candidate since the seat was formed. The closest result was in 1983, when Callaghan won by 5.5% of the vote.

Turnout
Turnout at general elections has ranged between 77.2% in 1992 and 56.2% in 2005.

Boundaries

1983–2010: The City of Cardiff wards of Butetown, Grangetown, Llanrumney, Rumney, Splott, and Trowbridge, and the Borough of Vale of Glamorgan wards of Alexandra (became Plymouth and St Augustine's from 2004), Cornerswell, Llandough, and Stanwell.

2010–present: The Cardiff electoral divisions of Butetown, Grangetown, Llanrumney, Rumney, Splott, and Trowbridge, and the Vale of Glamorgan County Borough electoral divisions of Cornerswell, Llandough, Plymouth, St Augustine's, Stanwell, and Sully.

Members of Parliament

Elections

Elections in the 1980s

Elections in the 1990s

Elections in the 2000s

Elections in the 2010s

Of the 135 rejected ballots:
63 were either unmarked or it was uncertain who the vote was for.
69 voted for more than one candidate.
3 had writing or a mark by which the voter could be identified.

Of the 121 rejected ballots:
82 were either unmarked or it was uncertain who the vote was for.
35 voted for more than one candidate.
4 had writing or a mark by which the voter could be identified.

Of the 107 rejected ballots:
76 were either unmarked or it was uncertain who the vote was for.
29 voted for more than one candidate.
2 had writing or a mark by which the voter could be identified.

Of the 160 rejected ballots:
132 were either unmarked or it was uncertain who the vote was for.
27 voted for more than one candidate.
1 had writing or mark by which the voter could be identified.

See also
 Cardiff South and Penarth (Senedd constituency)
 List of parliamentary constituencies in South Glamorgan
 List of parliamentary constituencies in Wales

Notes

References

External links
nomis Constituency Profile for Cardiff South and Penarth – presenting data from the ONS annual population survey and other official statistics.
Politics Resources (Election results from 1922 onwards)
Electoral Calculus (Election results from 1955 onwards)
2017 Election House of Commons Library 2017 Election report
A Vision Of Britain Through Time (Constituency elector numbers)

Politics of Cardiff
Parliamentary constituencies in South Wales
Constituencies of the Parliament of the United Kingdom established in 1983